Skei (also known as Skei i Jølster) is a village in Sunnfjord Municipality in Vestland county, Norway. The village is located at the northeastern end of the lake Jølstravatnet. Skei is located just west of Jostedalsbreen National Park. The village lies at the intersection of two major regional highways: European route E39 and Norwegian National Road 5.

The village was the administrative centre of the municipality of Jølster until its dissolution in 2020.

Notable residents
Asgeir Årdal (born 1983), a Norwegian cross-country skier

References

External links

Villages in Vestland
Sunnfjord